Radomir Radulović (born August 14, 1960) is a retired Serbian footballer.

References

1960 births
Living people
People from Sečanj
Yugoslav footballers
Serbian footballers
FK Partizan players
FC Istres players
Yugoslav First League players
Ligue 2 players
Serbian expatriate footballers
Expatriate footballers in France
Association football midfielders